The teams competing in Group 2 of the 2002 UEFA European Under-21 Championships qualifying competition were Cyprus, Estonia, Netherlands, Portugal and Republic of Ireland.

Standings

Matches
All times are CET.

External links
 Group 2 at UEFA.com

Group 2